The 2022 New Taipei City Wan Jin Shi Marathon（）was the twentieth edition of the annual marathon race in New Taipei City, the competition was held on Sunday 20 March 2022 and around 11,000 people join the races. The marathon events were won by Kenyan Felix Kimutai and Ethiopian Motu Megersa, Taiwanese runners Chou Ting-Yin and Lee Jia-Mei were the domestic first place.

Background 
On 25 October 2021, New Taipei City Government held the registration announcement press conference, the logo and slogan of the 2022 race are first in public. The slogan is "One of Us".

Prize

Invited elite runners

Results

Marathon

Challenge run

Media

New Taipei Sports Party 

To celebrate the twentieth anniversary of the race, New Taipei City Government, Sports Office named the marathon expo as "Go Pai! New Taipei Sports Party". There had a city image public art using wine basket and the tunnel of finisher medals in previous years WJS Marathon on this three day expo.

Two professional basketball team set in New Taipei City (Kings, CTBC DEA) were also be invited in this expo, and held a small fan meeting.

Footnote

Annotation

References

See also 
 New Taipei City Wan Jin Shi Marathon

2022 marathons